Perry Richard Nove  is a retired British senior police officer who served as Commissioner of the City of London Police from 1998 to 2002.

Police career
Nove was awarded the Queen's Police Medal (QPM) in the 1997 Queen's Birthday Honours in recognition of his service as assistant commissioner for the City of London Police. He was appointed Officer (Brother) of the Order of St John (OStJ) in 1999, and Commander of the Order of the British Empire (CBE) in the 2003 New Year Honours for services to the police.

References

Commissioners of the City of London Police
Living people
Year of birth missing (living people)
Commanders of the Order of the British Empire
English recipients of the Queen's Police Medal